Magical Maestro is a 1952 American animated short comedy film directed by Tex Avery and produced by Fred Quimby for Metro-Goldwyn-Mayer. It features the Great Poochini (played by Butch Dog), a canine opera singer who spurns a magician. The magician is able to replace Poochini's normal conductor prior to the show through disguise. In 1993, Magical Maestro was selected for preservation in the United States National Film Registry by the Library of Congress as being "culturally, historically, or aesthetically significant", making it the only Tex Avery cartoon so far to be inducted.

Plot
Attention-craving Mysto the Magician rudely interrupts a world-famous opera singer, the great Poochini (a pun on opera composer Giacomo Puccini), in the midst of his rehearsal to let him perform an opening act at the show that night. Mysto's tricks primarily come from his magic wand, which can summon flowers and rabbits. After Mysto performs a poorly executed dance and asks him if he gets the job, an annoyed and the unimpressed Poochini emphatically says "NO!" as he kicks Mysto out the door into the alley.

While on the ground, the self-pitying Mysto plays with his magic wand, but soon realizes he can pass it off as a conductor's baton; being further inspired by seeing himself in place of the conductor in a promotional poster outside the door and plans to get revenge on Poochini. Later, as the performance is starting he freezes the conductor, steals his tuxedo, nose and hair; then takes his place in front of the orchestra to conduct the Poochini, who is unaware of the imposter in front of him.

During the performance, in which Poochini (performed by the Colombian baritone Carlos Julio Ramírez) sings Largo al factotum from Gioacchino Rossini's 1816 opera The Barber of Seville, Mysto unleashes a variety of tricks with his wand. He begins tamely by summoning rabbits and flowers, then turning Poochini into a ballet dancer, an Indian, a tennis player, a prisoner rock-breaker, and a football player. Mysto's revenge gets more brutal as he throws a cymbal on Poochini's head, turning him Chinese and making him sing the Oriental riff; and next transforming him into a country singer and sings "Oh My Darling, Clementine". After levitating Poochini to the ceiling and slamming him down to the stage, Mysto turns him into a square dance caller. Poochini actually continues his performance for a good 20 seconds after this without interruption, except for the "hair gag" where he removes a hair from the film gate and tosses it away.

Poochini is then transformed into a Shirley Temple-esque child (who sings "A-Tisket, A-Tasket" before the balloon blows up and pops), then a Carmen Miranda-type singer, singing "Mamãe Eu Quero" (with two rabbits accompanying him on guitar) after an irritated audience member hurls an armload of fruit onto Poochini's head where it piles up like Miranda's headdress. The same man later sprays black ink on Poochini from a fountain pen, turning him into Bill Kenny from the Ink Spots, then drops an anvil on top of him, crushing him into a shorter height and deepening his voice to that of the Ink Spots' bass, "Hoppy" Jones (parodying the Ink Spots' famous "Top & Bottom" format).  After a rabbit hoses off Poochini's face and another rabbit works his arm like an automobile jack to get him back up to full height, the fun continues as he is transformed into a Hawaiian singer with two rabbits for harmony.

Reaching the end of the number, Mysto's plan is finally revealed to Poochini as his wig falls off. Mysto quickly puts the wig back on, but it's too late. Now set for revenge of his own, Poochini furiously grabs the hairpiece and puts it on while a now defeated and exposed Mysto cowardly tries to flee; but Poochini, having also grabbed the magic wand, stops the magician by using the wand on him as placing Mysto to the stage and unleashes the same gimmicks on the hapless magician at high speed. A red curtain with the words "The End" then falls on the magician and the rabbits (at the end of the Hawaiian singer shtick) thus ending the cartoon.

History
The concept of cartoons with insinuating situations is hardly new—Tex Avery especially featured a few quick jokes of this nature in his cartoons. Magical Maestro, for example, shows Poochini with a male and female rabbit on each arm. He lowers his arms behind his back and when he raises them again, he now has an additional dozen baby rabbits on them, six on each arm.

This cartoon features a gimmick only seen in Tex Avery films, the "hair gag". Because cartoons were shown originally in movie theatres, the film strip, if loaded incorrectly, would rub against the gate mechanism, shaving off tiny "hairs" of celluloid. These hairs would get caught in the "gate" of the projector. Sometimes it would skitter across the projection light, resulting in a gigantic hair appearing on the movie screen. In this cartoon, the opera singer pauses mid-song to pluck the offending hair from the film and tosses it aside, one of Avery's many ways of his characters breaking the fourth wall. It wasn't the first time Avery used this gag: it was also used in Aviation Vacation (1941).

The role of Poochini is portrayed by Butch the Irish dog, a frequent star of Avery's cartoons of that era (often alongside Droopy).

Influence
The "hair gag" would later be used by English comedian Benny Hill in the closing chase sequence of his April 25, 1984 show. As he is being chased by medical staff and an ambulance in and around a hospital area, he notices a hair moving around the bottom right corner of the screen, and at a certain point stops his pursuers long enough for him to pluck the hair out before the chase resumes.

Tom and Jerry Tales episode "Way-Off Broadway" features a gag similar to Poochini's transformations, in that Tom is forced to adapt to various pieces music when Jerry changes them on a radio.

References

External links
Magical Maestro essay  by Thad Komorowski on the National Film Registry website 

Magical Maestro essay by Daniel Eagan in America's Film Legacy: The Authoritative Guide to the Landmark Movies in the National Film Registry, A&C Black, 2010 , pages 454-456 

1952 animated films
1952 short films
1952 films
Films directed by Tex Avery
Internet memes
Film and television memes
1950s Italian-language films
Films about magic and magicians
Films about opera
Metro-Goldwyn-Mayer animated short films
United States National Film Registry films
1950s animated short films
1950s American animated films
Self-reflexive films
Films based on The Barber of Seville
Films produced by Fred Quimby
Films scored by Scott Bradley
Metro-Goldwyn-Mayer cartoon studio short films
Film controversies
Race-related controversies in animation
Race-related controversies in film
Ethnic humour
1950s English-language films